Kalymnos Island National Airport  is an airport on the island of Kalymnos in Greece. The airport is located a few kilometers from Pothaia (or Pothia), the capital of Kalymnos. It is also known as Kalymnos National Airport.

History
This airport commenced operations on 10 August 2006.

Airlines and destinations
The following airlines operate regular scheduled and charter flights at Kalymnos Island National Airport:

Statistics

See also
Transport in Greece

References

External links
 Airport Traffic Statistics

Airports in Greece
Buildings and structures in the South Aegean
Kalymnos